Manchot Island is a rocky island lying in the entrance to Port Martin, Antarctica. The island was photographed from the air by U.S. Navy Operation Highjump, 1946–47, and was charted by the French Antarctic Expedition, 1949–51. It was so named by the French expedition because a large Adélie penguin rookery was located on the island, and "manchot" is a French word for penguin.

See also 
 List of Antarctic and sub-Antarctic islands

References

Islands of Adélie Land